Betham is a surname, and may refer to:

 Asa Betham (born 1838), United States Navy sailor and Medal of Honor recipient
 Cecilia Betham (1843–1913), Irish archer
 Fred Betham (1915–1984), Samoan politician and diplomat
 Geoffrey Betham (1899–1962), English cricketer and British Indian Army officer
 Jaclyn Betham (born 1986), American actress and ballet dancer
 John Betham (1642?–1709), English Catholic priest and tutor to James Francis Edward Stuart
 Mary Matilda Betham (1776–1852), English poet and painter
 Matilda Betham-Edwards (1836–1919), English novelist and travel writer
 Monty Betham (born 1978), New Zealand boxer and rugby league footballer
 Monty Betham (boxer) (born 1952), New Zealand boxer
 Peter Betham (born 1989), New Zealand rugby union player
 Richard Betham, Samoan boxer
 Stephen Betham, Samoan rugby union coach
 Thomas de Betham, English politician
 William Betham (1749–1839), English clergyman and antiquarian
 William Betham (1779–1853), English herald and antiquarian who held the office of Ulster King of Arms

See also 
 Beetham (disambiguation)
 Bentham (surname)